"Stay" is a song by Australian rapper and singer the Kid Laroi and Canadian singer Justin Bieber. It was released through Grade A Productions and Columbia Records on 9 July 2021, as the lead single (sixth overall) from Laroi's reloaded mixtape, F*ck Love 3: Over You. Laroi and Bieber wrote the song with Haan, FnZ members Finatik & Zac, and producers Cashmere Cat, Charlie Puth, Omer Fedi, and Blake Slatkin. The song marks the second collaboration between the two artists, following Bieber's song, "Unstable", a track from his sixth studio album, Justice.

"Stay" peaked at number one on the Billboard Hot 100, becoming Laroi's first chart-topping song and Bieber's eighth. The song additionally topped the Billboard Global 200. Furthermore, it reached number one in 21 other countries, including their respective natives Australia and  Canada, along with Germany, the Netherlands, New Zealand, Norway, South Korea, and Sweden. It also peaked within the top ten in 18 other countries. At the 2021 ARIA Music Awards, the song won the ARIA Award for Best Pop Release, which resulted in Laroi and Bieber both winning the ARIA Award for Best Artist. At the APRA Music Awards of 2022, the song won the award for Song of the Year.

Background
On 20 September 2020, Laroi shared a snippet of the song on an Instagram live stream, followed by a longer snippet in better quality that was previewed on a live stream from Rolling Loud on 29 October 2020. Bieber's contribution to the song was revealed on 31 May 2021. The song leaked in full on a Discord server on 2 June 2021.

"Stay" marks Laroi's first major single release as a lead artist in 2021 and Bieber's first major single as a lead artist since the release of his second extended play, Freedom, which was released in April 2021. On 3 June 2021, Scooter Braun, who has been Bieber's manager from the start of his career, also became Laroi's manager, until Laroi left and joined Adam Leber at Rebel Management on 27 September 2021.

Laroi had the song for about a year before its release. He created the song while spending time with producers Charlie Puth, Omer Fedi, and Blake Slatkin at Slatkin's house. Puth played the melody of the song on the keyboard, but Laroi ended up liking it and wanted to get it in production software Pro Tools to use it to create a song. He felt that "it was probably the most organic way of making a song I've ever done – ever". Laroi thought Bieber "would sound perfect", so he went to the studio at which Bieber records; they finished recording the song, but Bieber was hesitant about whether his vocals sounded good or not.

Composition and lyrics

"Stay" is a fast-paced pop rap, pop rock, and synth-pop song. It is set in the key of D major and incorporates piano keys, heavy drums, and "splattering" synths. The upward-darting keyboard riff, made on a Roland Juno-60 synthesizer owned by producer Blake Slatkin, serves as the song's spine and eventually becomes the chorus melody. Over a repeated melodic cell, Laroi and Bieber switch between head voice and chest voice on a minor sixth. Jon Caramanica of The New York Times described the track as a "hyper-slick" hybridization of new wave and pop-punk. Some critics found similarities between it and the music from Bieber's sixth studio album, Justice (2021). Justin Curto from Vulture compared the song's sound to Justice single "Hold On" and album tracks "Die for You" and "Somebody". Stereogums Chris DeVille characterised it as SoundCloud pop-rap as effervescent Justice-style '80s pop".

The "heartbreak-fueled" lyrics to "Stay" enforce Laroi's toxic behaviour as he sets up a story about a troubled relationship where he is at fault. In the chorus, he sings about his broken promises before begging for his partner to stay with him: "I do the same thing I told you that I never would / I told you I'd change, even when I knew I never could." Robert Rowat of CBC Music interpreted the lines as "an admission of weakness, if not a promise to be better". Bieber's verse echoes similar sentiments as he belts out lyrics about being unable to live without his loved one: "When I'm away from you, I miss your touch / You're the reason I believe in love." The song reaches its climax as Laroi and Bieber's voices join in the last chorus.

Release and promotion
On 16 June 2021, Laroi and Bieber hinted at another collaboration. Leading up to its release, the two artists both teased the song multiple times on their respective social media accounts by posting snippets and teasing the lyrics. Laroi also had previously stated on social media that Ron Perry, the label boss of Columbia Records would not release the song, to which Laroi asked his fans to repeatedly spam Ron Perry on Instagram, which would hopefully change his mind into releasing it. Laroi posted a picture of him at a basketball game on Instagram on 27 June 2021, holding a piece of paper that wrote the song title and the then-questionable release date, to which American singer-songwriter Charlie Puth, who is one of the producers of the song, teased his involvement of the song by commenting "Yessssssssss". Three days later, Laroi shared a pre-order link in order to reveal the cover art, which would be posted the following day.

Critical reception
The song has received generally positive reviews. Writing for The New York Times, Jon Caramanica found "Stay" to be  effective", considering it a more effective pairing of Laroi and Bieber than their previous collaboration on "Unstable" from the latter's sixth studio album, Justice. Tyler Jenke from Rolling Stone Australia wrote that "the slick new tune" is "undoubtedly one that lives up [to] the hype". Jordan Rose of Complex believed that the track has Laroi and Bieber "leaning into their strengths". Alex Zidel from HotNewHipHop felt that the song is "every bit as infectious as [one] would expect" and thought of it to be "a solid pop offering for the summer". Jason Lipshutz of Billboard opined that the song "sounds like it should push [Laroi] to a new level" of stardom. Uproxx contributing writer Carolyn Droke stated that the "buoyant track['s]" combination of "a euphoric chorus and a driving beat" will make it "the next song of the summer". Robert Rowat of CBC Music commended Laroi and Bieber's partnership as "one of the year's best surprises" and said that the song "capitalizes on both singers' skills as falsettists". Chris DeVille from Stereogum described the song as "maniacally catchy" and thought it musically feels like Laroi "blasting off into a new frontier of crossover success". Vultures Justin Curto called the track "a high-energy, synth-filled pop banger". However, he later criticised the song for being "some of Laroi's most anonymous work yet" and concluded that "it could just as easily be a hit for the Weeknd or Post Malone".

Accolades

Commercial performance
"Stay" debuted at number one on the ARIA Singles Chart for the week of 19 July 2021. It became Laroi's second number-one single in Australia after "Without You" topped the chart for a week in May and Bieber's fifth as a lead artist. It held on to its position for 14 consecutive weeks, becoming the longest-running number-one single of 2021. In January 2022, the song returned to the number one spot following the 2021 Triple J Hottest 100's announcement and remained there for three additional weeks. Its 17-week reign became the longest run at the top of the ARIA Singles Chart by a male artist(s) and the second-longest overall.

In New Zealand, "Stay" entered at the top of the New Zealand Singles Chart, securing Laroi's first number-one single in the country and Bieber's 11th overall. The song spent more weeks at number one than any other by an Australian male, maintaining that position for 11 non-consecutive weeks.

In the United Kingdom, "Stay" entered at number five on the UK Singles Chart on 16 July 2021 – for the week ending dated 22 July 2021 – making it Laroi's second top ten hit in Britain and Bieber's 27th. It rose three places to number two a week later, behind Ed Sheeran's "Bad Habits" during its fourth week at the summit. It stayed at number two for six weeks and became Laroi's joint-highest-charting song in the UK along with "Without You".

In Ireland, "Stay" entered at number three on the Irish Singles Chart as the week's highest new entry. The track became Bieber's 60th top 50 single in the Irish Republic. The song moved up a spot the following week to a new peak of number two behind "Bad Habits" for eight weeks, becoming Laroi's highest-charting song in Ireland.

In the United States, "Stay" debuted at number three on the Billboard Hot 100, starting with 34.7 million streams, 12.9 million in radio audience, and 12,000 in sales. It entered atop the Streaming Songs chart, becoming Laroi's first and Bieber's sixth leader there, and at number five on the Digital Song Sales chart. Laroi earned his third top 10 hit on the Hot 100 and a new career best, surpassing the number eight peak of "Without You" with Miley Cyrus. In addition to Bieber getting his 24th top 10 hit on the chart, he became the youngest artist to have 100 entries appear on the Hot 100 at 27 years and four months old. On the week of 14 August 2021, the song topped the Billboard Hot 100, dethroning BTS' "Butter" and becoming Laroi's first and Bieber's eighth number-one hit on the chart. It stayed at the number-one position for four consecutive weeks, surpassing "Sorry" as Bieber's longest reign as a lead artist. The song also became Laroi's first number one on the Pop Airplay chart (where it went on to spend 13 weeks at #1, the second longest run at #1 in the history of the chart, behind Ace of Base's "The Sign"), while Bieber tied Bruno Mars for the most number ones on the chart among solo males with nine each. On the week of 25 September 2021, "Stay" returned to number one on the Hot 100 for a fifth week as it topped the Radio Songs chart for the first time, becoming the first and fifth leader for Laroi and Bieber, respectively. The song spent seven non-consecutive weeks at number one on the Hot 100. It additionally logged a record 14 non-consecutive weeks at number two of the Hot 100. As of the chart dated 2 April 2022, "Stay" also broke the records for the most weeks spent in the Hot 100's top two and top three spots, with 21 and 23 weeks respectively. The record has since been surpassed by Harry Styles' "As It Was" with 25 and 29 weeks, respectively in 2022. On 18 April 2022, "Stay" became the first song in history to spend its first 40 weeks consecutively in the top 10 of the Hot 100.

On the Rolling Stone Top 100, the song earned Laroi his first number one with 30.8 million streams on opening week. It spent seven straight weeks at number one on the chart, becoming just the third song to do so after Roddy Ricch's "The Box" and Rodrigo's "Good 4 U". The track was named "2021's Song of the Summer" by Variety based on a song project report from Alpha Data, where it earned 1.5 million units. As of 28 October 2021, the song has accumulated 1.1 billion in airplay audience and 537.6 million U.S. streams and has sold 177,200 downloads.

"Stay" additionally topped the charts in Austria, both regions of Belgium (Flanders and Wallonia), Bieber's native Canada, the Czech Republic, Denmark, Finland, Germany, Iceland, India, Israel, Malaysia, the Netherlands, Norway, Singapore, Slovakia, South Korea, and Sweden, and peaked within the top 10 in France, Italy, Japan, Portugal, and Switzerland. Worldwide, the song debuted at number two on the Billboard Global 200 behind BTS's "Permission to Dance". It opened with 76.3 million streams and 18,600 sold. The song ascended to number one on its third week with 75.1 million streams and 13,900 in sales, making it Laroi's first leader on the chart and Bieber's second after "Peaches". It later topped the Billboard Global Excl. U.S. on the chart dated 21 August 2021, dethroning "Bad Habits". The song was the longest-reigning number one on the Global 200, at the time and the first to lead it for double-digits, spending a total of eleven weeks at the top of the chart. On 4 November 2021, the song reportedly reached one billion streams on Spotify, becoming the fastest to do so in 118 days and surpassing the previous record held by Sheeran with "Shape of You" in 153 days. "Stay" was the most-streamed song globally on Apple Music in 2022.

Music video
The official music video for "Stay", directed by Colin Tilley, premiered alongside the song's release at midnight on 9 July 2021. It depicts Laroi and Bieber dancing in a city where time has stopped flowing and all other people are frozen still. Elisa Talbot served as the video's cinematographer while Jack Winter produced it, with Jamee Ranta and Tilley as executive producers. The music video has more than 600 million views on YouTube as of 11 August 2022.

Live performances
"Stay" received its first live performance on 9 July 2021, the same day as its release, where Laroi joined Bieber during his set at the Encore Theater at the Wynn in Las Vegas.  A live performance video of the song from the show was uploaded on Laroi's YouTube channel on 12 July. The two performed it on 10 July at the grand opening of the hotel's new supper club, Delilah, towards the end of Bieber's eight-song set. On 5 September, Bieber also brought Laroi out to perform "Stay" during his set of the Made In America Festival in Philadelphia, Pennsylvania, in which he was one of the headliners of alongside American rapper Lil Baby. Exactly one week later, Bieber invited Laroi to perform the song at the 2021 MTV Video Music Awards from the Barclays Center in Brooklyn, New York, for his two-song set that also included his performance of his single, "Ghost". Laroi appeared on a dimly lit stage to perform a stripped-back version of the song during Jimmy Kimmel Live! on 29 October, where he was accompanied by a pianist. On 24 November, Laroi closed out the 2021 ARIA Music Awards with a punk-inspired rendition of the song backed by a full band in front of a small club audience. On 11 December, Bieber gave his first solo performance of the song during the Capital FM's Jingle Ball festival at the O2 Arena in London, England, in which he sang his verse of the song and a portion of the chorus before it without the song playing at all.

Credits and personnel
Credits adapted from Tidal.

 The Kid Laroi – vocals, songwriting
 Justin Bieber – vocals, songwriting
 Cashmere Cat – production, songwriting, keyboards, programming
 Charlie Puth – production, songwriting, keyboards, programming
 Omer Fedi – production, songwriting, bass, guitar, keyboards, programming
 Blake Slatkin – production, songwriting, bass, guitar, keyboards, programming
 FnZ
 Finatik – songwriting
 Zac – songwriting
 Haan – songwriting
 Heidi Wang – engineering
 John Hanes – engineering
 Şerban Ghenea – mixing
 Chris Athens – mastering
 Elijah Marrett-Hitch – recording
 Josh Gudwin – recording, vocal production

Charts

Weekly charts

Year-end charts

Certifications

Release history

See also
List of Billboard Hot 100 number ones of 2021
List of highest-certified singles in Australia
List of number-one songs of 2021 (Malaysia)
List of number-one songs of 2021 (Singapore)

References

2021 singles
2021 songs
APRA Award winners
ARIA Award-winning songs
The Kid Laroi songs
Justin Bieber songs
Billboard Hot 100 number-one singles
Billboard Global 200 number-one singles
Billboard Global Excl. U.S. number-one singles
Canadian Hot 100 number-one singles
Columbia Records singles
Dutch Top 40 number-one singles
Gaon Digital Chart number-one singles
Male vocal duets
Music videos directed by Colin Tilley
Number-one singles in Australia
Number-one singles in Austria
Number-one singles in Denmark
Number-one singles in Finland
Number-one singles in Germany
Number-one singles in Iceland
Number-one singles in India
Number-one singles in Israel
Number-one singles in Malaysia
Number-one singles in New Zealand
Number-one singles in Norway
Number-one singles in Poland
Number-one singles in Singapore
Number-one singles in Sweden
Song recordings produced by Cashmere Cat
Song recordings produced by Charlie Puth
Song recordings produced by Omer Fedi
Songs about parting
Songs written by Cashmere Cat
Songs written by Charlie Puth
Songs written by Justin Bieber
Songs written by Omer Fedi
Songs written by the Kid Laroi
Ultratop 50 Singles (Flanders) number-one singles
Ultratop 50 Singles (Wallonia) number-one singles
Synth-pop songs
Pop rock songs
Pop-rap songs